Odontosagda superbum is a species of air-breathing land snail, a terrestrial pulmonate gastropod mollusk in the family Sagdidae.

Distribution 
This species occurs in Departement de l'Ouest in Haiti.

References

Sagdidae
Gastropods described in 1880